Stephen Paul "Steve" Ford (born 15 August 1965 in Cardiff) was a Welsh international rugby union winger. After being banned from rugby union for an act of professionalism, he was eventually allowed back into the sport and went on to represent the Wales national team. He played club rugby for Cardiff.

Rugby career
Steve Ford played rugby as a schoolboy representing Llanrumney High School. He joined Rumney RFC but in 1985 he played in two trial matches for Leeds, a rugby league team. Although he never played for Leeds or any other league side, by attending the trials the Welsh Rugby Union deemed this an act of professionalism and suspended him from playing rugby union. In April 1985 Ford's suspension was lifted and he was allowed to play the game of union again, joining Cardiff.

In 1990 he won his first full international cap, facing Ireland as part of the 1990 Five Nations Championship. Ford was utilised on the wing, and scored a try on his debut. Despite this Wales lost the match 14-8. Ford was next selected for Wales on their 1990 Summer tour of Namibia. Ford played in both tour Tests against Namibia, Wales winning both.

After representing Wales against the touring Barbarians in October 1990, Ford was selected for the 1991 Five Nations Championship. Ford played in three of the Championship matches; the loss to England at Cardiff followed by a second defeat, this time to Scotland in which Ford scored his second and final international try. Ford's final home nations game was a draw with Ireland. Ford's final international was during the 1991 Wales tour of Australia, in which Wales were crushed 63-6 by Australia in Brisbane.

Although he never played in any of the matches of the tournament, Ford was part of the Wales team that participated in the 1991 Rugby World Cup, hosted by England. Despite not representing the Wales team in the years following, he was chosen for the Wales squad for the 1995 Rugby World Cup but again failed to be selected for any of the tournament games.

International matches played
Wales
  1991
 Barbarians 1990
  1991
  1990, 1991
  1990, 1990
  1991

References

1965 births
Cardiff RFC players
Living people
Rugby union players from Cardiff
Rugby union wings
Rumney RFC players
Wales international rugby union players
Welsh rugby union players